Saranalayam is a 1983 Indian Tamil language film directed by R. Sundarrajan.  starring Mohan, Nalini, Thengai Srinivasan, Manorama and S. S. Chandran. The score and soundtrack were composed by M. S. Viswanathan which went on average at boxoffice

Cast 
 Mohan
 Nalini
 Thengai Srinivasan 
 Manorama
 S.S. Chandran
 Karuppu Subbiah
 Kullamani
 R. Sundarrajan in Guest Appearances

Soundtrack 
All songs lyrics were written by Vaali and Gangai Amaran. and music was composed by M. S. Viswanathan.

References

External links 
 

Films directed by R. Sundarrajan
1983 films
1980s Tamil-language films
1983 romantic drama films
Indian romantic drama films
Films scored by M. S. Viswanathan